Barley Charlie was an Australian television sitcom which aired in 1964. It was the second television sitcom produced in Australia; being preceded by the 1957-1959 series Take That, although that Crawford Productions sitcom had only aired in Melbourne.

Overview
Barley Charlie aired for 13 episodes, produced by GTV-9 and also shown on other stations across Australia. Though short-lived, the series was a ratings success. The main cast were Sheila Bradley, Robina Beard, and Eddie Hepple. 

The National Film and Sound Archive hold at least four episodes of Barley Charlie as well as some documentation.

Premise
The premise was developed by the British scriptwriting team of Chesney and Wolfe while they were visiting Australia in the wake of the worldwide success of The Rag Trade.

Joan and Shirley Muggleton are two cityslicker sisters who inherit a roadhouse cafe and garage midway between Melbourne and Sydney. Working there is Charlie Appleby, a lazy and clueless mechanic.

References

External links

Barley Charlie at Austlit
Copy of episode at YouTube

1964 Australian television series debuts
1964 Australian television series endings
Australian television sitcoms
Nine Network original programming
Black-and-white Australian television shows
English-language television shows
Australian workplace comedy television series